Tavilan may refer to:
 Tavilan-e Olya
 Tavilan-e Sofla

See also
 Taviran (disambiguation)